This is a discography of UK pop group Bucks Fizz.

Formed in 1981, the group reached number one three times in the UK and scored 20 chart hits. Their biggest selling single in the UK is "The Land of Make Believe", while worldwide it is "Making Your Mind Up" at 4 million copies sold. The group's first week on the singles chart was 28 March 1981, with their last week falling on 19 November 1988. With albums, the group saw less success, but managed to chart seven times, with three of them reaching the top 20 and five in the top 40. Are You Ready is the biggest selling of these. Their first week on the album charts was 8 August 1981, while their most recent week was 26 May 2007.

Since the 2010s, a spin-off group, called The Fizz has been working, consisting of three of the original members of the band. In 2017, they returned the Bucks Fizz name to the UK charts with their album The F-Z of Pop.

Albums

Studio albums

Compilation albums

Live albums

Singles

Video / DVD releases

Music videos
The following is a list of music videos which were produced to accompany their singles. No videos were made for "One of Those Nights", "Magical" or "You Love Love" (or non-UK releases). "Making Your Mind Up" was a BBC-made production for the Eurovision Song Contest 1981 previews.

References

Discographies of British artists
Pop music group discographies